Glyncorrwg Rugby Football Club are a Welsh rugby union club based in the town of Glyncorrwg in Wales, UK. The club is a member of the Welsh Rugby Union and is also a feeder club for the Ospreys. The club fields a First, Youth, and several juniors teams.

Notable former players
  Emlyn Davies (2 caps)

References

Welsh rugby union teams
Rugby union in Neath Port Talbot